During the 2017–18 season, Cádiz CF are participating in the Spanish LaLiga 1|2|3, and the Copa del Rey.

Squad

Transfers
List of Spanish football transfers summer 2017#Cádiz

In

Out

Competitions

Overall

Liga

League table

Matches

Copa del Rey

References

Cádiz CF seasons
Cádiz CF